John H. Pell (January 1, 1831 - February 6, 1902) was a member of the Minnesota State Senate (District 10), under the 3rd Minnesota Legislature, elected 1861. He was also a soldier in the American Civil War, serving in the 1st Minnesota Volunteer Infantry, Company I from April 29, 1861 - March 26, 1863. He later served in the United States Volunteers, Adjutant General Department (Captain and Assistant Adjutant General) from May 25, 1863 - May 25, 1865.

He is the founder of Oakwood Township, Wabasha County, Minnesota.

References

People of Minnesota in the American Civil War
1831 births
1902 deaths
People from New York (state)
Minnesota state senators
Union Army officers
19th-century American politicians